Stephen Mitchell (born 1943 in Brooklyn, New York) is a poet, translator, scholar, and anthologist. He is married to Byron Katie, founder of The Work.

Education
Stephen Mitchell was born to a Jewish family, educated at Amherst College, the University of Paris, and Yale University, and "de-educated" through intensive Zen practice. He studied for four and a half years with Zen master Seungsahn and for two and a half years with Robert Baker Aitken, Rōshi.

Career
Mitchell's translations and adaptions include the Tao Te Ching, which has sold over a million copies, Gilgamesh, The Iliad, The Odyssey, The Gospel According to Jesus, Bhagavad Gita, The Book of Job, The Second Book of the Tao, and The Selected Poetry of Rainer Maria Rilke. He twice won the Harold Morton Landon Translation Award from the Academy of American Poets. His Selected Rilke has been called “the most beautiful group of poetic translations [the twentieth] century has produced” (Chicago Tribune), his Gilgamesh was runner-up for the first annual Quill award for poetry, and his Iliad was one of the New Yorker's Favorite Books of 2011.

He is also coauthor of three of his wife's bestselling books: Loving What Is, A Thousand Names for Joy, and A Mind at Home with Itself. His 2019 book, Joseph and the Way of Forgiveness, is a Zen-inflected midrash on the Joseph story from the Book of Genesis. The First Christmas is a reimagining of the Nativity story.

Books

Poetry
Parables and Portraits, HarperCollins, 1990,

Fiction
The First Christmas, St. Martin's Essentials, 2021, 
Joseph and the Way of Forgiveness, St. Martin's Essentials, 2019, 
The Frog Prince: A Fairy Tale for Consenting Adults, Harmony Books, 1999, 
Meetings with the Archangel: A Comedy of the Spirit, HarperCollins, 1998,

Nonfiction
A Mind at Home with Itself: How Asking Four Questions Can Free Your Mind, Open Your Heart, and Turn Your World Around, by Byron Katie with Stephen Mitchell, HarperOne, 2017, 
A Thousand Names for Joy: Living in Harmony with the Way Things Are (with Byron Katie), Harmony Books, 2007, 
Loving What Is: Four Questions That Can Change Your Life (with Byron Katie), Harmony Books, 2002, 
The Gospel According to Jesus, Harper Perennial, 1993,

Translations and adaptations
Beowulf, Yale University Press, October, 2017, 
The Odyssey, Atria Books (Simon & Schuster), 2013, 
The Iliad, Free Press, 2011, 
The Second Book of the Tao, Penguin Press, 2009, 
Gilgamesh: A New English Version,  Free Press, 2004, 
Bhagavad Gita: A New Translation, Harmony Books, 2002, 
Real Power: Business Lessons from the Tao Te Ching (with James A. Autry), Riverhead Books, 1998, 
Full Woman, Fleshly Apple, Hot Moon: Selected Poems of Pablo Neruda, HarperCollins, 1997, 
Genesis: A New Translation of the Classic Biblical Stories,  Harper Collins, 1996, 
Ahead of All Parting: The Selected Poetry and Prose of Rainer Maria Rilke, Modern Library, 1995, 0-67-960161-9
A Book of Psalms: Selected and Adapted from the Hebrew, Harper Perennial, 1994, 
The Selected Poetry of Dan Pagis, University of California Press, 1996, 
Tao Te Ching, HarperCollins, 1988, hardcover , paperback , ISBN paperback P.S. edition 0-06-114266-2, pocket edition , illustrated edition 
The Book of Job, Harper Perennial, 1992, 
The Selected Poetry of Yehuda Amichai (with Chana Bloch), University of California Press, 1996, 
The Sonnets to Orpheus by Rainer Maria Rilke, Simon & Schuster, 1985, 
The Lay of the Love and Death of Cornet Christoph Rilke by Rainer Maria Rilke, Graywolf Press, 1985, 
Letters to a Young Poet by Rainer Maria Rilke, Random House, 1984, 
The Notebooks of Malte Laurids Brigge by Rainer Maria Rilke, Random House, 1983, 
The Selected Poetry of Rainer Maria Rilke, Random House 1982, Vintage, 1989, 
"Tao Te King", Lao Tseu, Synchronique Editions, 2008
"Tao Te King, Un Voyage Illustré", Lao Tseu, Synchronique Editions, 2008
"Tao Te King", édition Poche, Lao Tseu, Synchronique Editions, 2012
"Gilgamesh, la quête de l'immortalité", traducteur français Aurélien Clause, Synchronique Editions, 2013

As editor
Question Your Thinking, Change the World: Quotations from Byron Katie, Hay House, 2007, 
The Essence of Wisdom: Words from the Masters to Illuminate the Spiritual Path, Broadway Books, 1998, 
Bestiary: An Anthology of Poems about Animals, Frog, Ltd., 1996, 
Into the Garden: A Wedding Anthology (with Robert Hass), HarperCollins, 1993, 
The Enlightened Mind: An Anthology of Sacred Prose, 1991, 
The Enlightened Heart: An Anthology of Sacred Poetry, HarperCollins, 1989, 
Dropping Ashes on the Buddha: The Teaching of Zen Master Seung Sahn, Grove Press, 1976,

Children's books
The Ugly Duckling, by Hans Christian Andersen (illustrated by Steve Johnson and Lou Fancher), Candlewick Press, 2007, 
Iron Hans: A Grimms’ Fairy Tale (illustrated by Matt Tavares),  Candlewick Press, 2007, 
Genies, Meanies, and Magic Rings: Three Tales from the Arabian Nights (illustrated by Tom Pohrt), Walker & Co., 2007, 
The Tinderbox, by Hans Christian Andersen (illustrated by Bagram Ibatoulline), Candlewick Press, 2007, 
The Wishing Bone and Other Poems (illustrated by Tom Pohrt), Candlewick Press, 2003, 
The Nightingale, by Hans Christian Andersen (illustrated by Bagram Ibatoulline), Candlewick Press, 2002, 
Jesus: What He Really Said and Did, Harpertempest 2002, 
The Creation (illustrated by Ori Sherman), Dial Books, 1990,

References

External links
  – including (audio) 2005 conversation with Pico Iyer
 "In the Beginning Was the Word", 1996 interview at Psychology Today about his translation of Genesis 
 Undated interview at PBS.org
 "Approaching Prayer", 2009 interview of Mitchell and others by   Krista Tippett, Speaking of Faith 
 "Man of Letters Beyond Words", 2001 interview at Publishers Weekly (PW)  
 "PW Talks with Stephen Mitchell", 2002 interview at PW
 "Bhagavad Gita: A New Translation", 2000 book review at PW 
 

1943 births
Amherst College alumni
Yale University alumni
Chinese–English translators
German–English translators
Hebrew–English translators
Greek–English translators
Sanskrit–English translators
Translators of the Bible into English
Living people
American male writers
Translators of Homer
21st-century American Jews
Jewish American writers